Sergey Volkov may refer to:
Sergei Volkov (footballer, born 1980), Russian football player
Sergey Volkov (footballer, born 1995), Russian football player
Sergei Volkov (footballer, born 2002), Russian football player
Sergey Volkov (cosmonaut) (born 1973), Russian cosmonaut
Sergey Volkov (figure skater) (1949–1990), Soviet figure skater
Sergey Volkov (chess player) (born 1974), Russian chess grandmaster
Sergey Volkov (skier) (born 1987), Russian freestyle skier
Syarhey Volkaw (born 1999), Belarusian football player
Sabbas (or Savva; born Sergey Aleksandrovich Volkov) (born 1958), bishop of the Moldovan Orthodox Church

See also
Sergei Volchkov (disambiguation)